Iași (historically referred to as Jassy, Yassy, Yassi, Iassy, or Iassi) is a city in Moldavia, northeastern Romania.

Iași may also refer to:

Places in Romania 
 Iași County
 Iași, a village in Recea Commune, Brașov County
 Iași-Gorj, a village in Drăguțești Commune, Gorj County
 Iașu, a village in Ulieș Commune, Harghita County

Historic geography 
 Municipium Iasorum, an autonomous territory in ancient Roman Pannonia (in present-day Croatia)

Other uses 
 Jasz people, an ethnic group in Hungary, of Ossetic origin
IASI, the Infrared atmospheric sounding interferometer
Iași Open, a professional tennis tournament

See also
Jassy (disambiguation)
Yasi (disambiguation)
Lasi (disambiguation)